Agdistis riftvalleyi is a moth in the family Pterophoridae. It is known from Kenya and Yemen.

References

Agdistinae
Moths of the Middle East
Moths of Africa
Moths described in 2001